Emil Stankov Petrov (born 22 July 1983, in Samokov) is a retired Bulgarian football goalkeeper.

References

External links
 

1983 births
Living people
Bulgarian footballers
Association football goalkeepers
First Professional Football League (Bulgaria) players
PFC Slavia Sofia players
PFC Spartak Pleven players
FC Septemvri Sofia players
FC Pirin Razlog players
People from Samokov
Sportspeople from Sofia Province